James, Jim or Jimmy Blyth may refer to:

James Blyth (engineer) (1839–1906), Scottish electrical engineer
James Blyth, 1st Baron Blyth (1841–1925), English businessman and Liberal Party supporter
James Blyth, Baron Blyth of Rowington (born 1940), Scottish businessman
Jim Blyth (footballer, born 1890) (1890–?), Scottish footballer
Jim Blyth (footballer, born 1911) (1911–1979), Scottish footballer
Jim Blyth (footballer, born 1955), Scottish football goalkeeper
Jimmy Blythe (1901–1931), American musician

See also
Blyth (disambiguation)